Aykut is a Turkish masculine name and may refer to:

Given name
 Aykut Demir (born 1988), Turkish footballer
 Aykut Erçetin (born 1982), Turkish footballer
 Aykut Hilmi, British actor
 Aykut Karaman (born 1947), Turkish architect
 Aykut Kaya (born 1990), Turkish karateka
 Aykut Kocaman (born 1965), former Turkish footballer
 Aykut Özer (born 1993), Turkish footballer
 Aykut Öztürk (born 1987), Turkish footballer

Surname
 İmren Aykut (born 1940), Turkish female economist, politician and former government minister
 Serkan Aykut (born 1975), former Turkish footballer

Surnames
Turkish-language surnames
Turkish masculine given names